Bocula anticlina is a moth of the family Erebidae. It is found in Borneo.

The wingspan is about 15 mm for females and 17 mm for males.

External links
 Moths of Borneo

Calpinae
Moths described in 2005